Trail is a census-designated place and unincorporated community in Jackson County, Oregon, United States. As of the 2010 census it had a population of 702. It has a post office with a ZIP code of 97541.

Trail lies at the intersection of Oregon Route 227 and Oregon Route 62, just north of Shady Cove and west of Lost Creek Lake, a reservoir of the Rogue River. Trail is located around the mouth of Trail Creek at the Rogue River.

Demographics

Climate
This region experiences warm (but not hot) and dry summers, with no average monthly temperatures above 71.6 °F.  According to the Köppen Climate Classification system, Trail has a warm-summer Mediterranean climate, abbreviated "Csb" on climate maps.

References

Unincorporated communities in Jackson County, Oregon
Census-designated places in Oregon
Census-designated places in Jackson County, Oregon
Unincorporated communities in Oregon